A Signal of Peace is an 1890 bronze equestrian sculpture by Cyrus Edwin Dallin located in Lincoln Park, Chicago. 

A Signal of Peace is one of Dallin's four most prominent sculptures of indigenous people known as The Epic of the Indian, which also includes The Medicine Man (1899), Protest of the Sioux (1904), and Appeal to the Great Spirit (1908).

History
Cyrus Dallin created the sculpture while on his first trip to Paris in 1889-1890. The model for his preliminary studies was Philip, son of Kicking Bear and a participant in Buffalo Bill's Wild West Show. He took a risk and had it cast at his own expense for display at the Paris Salon of 1890 where it won an honorable mention. While modeling A Signal of Peace, he worked beside a friend the female French Artist, Rosa Bonheur.

The sculpture was exhibited at the 1893 World's Columbian Exposition.
It was dedicated on June 9, 1894. The sculpture cost $10,000, and was donated by Lambert Tree.

Visual Properties 
The monument is a life-size bronze statue that depicts a Native American man, almost fully nude, riding on top of a "placid prarie pony."

See also
 List of public art in Chicago
Cyrus Dallin Art Museum

References

External links
A Signal of Peace Chicago Outdoor Sculptures
waymarking
Cyrus E. Dallin Museum Arlington, Massachusetts

1890 establishments in Illinois
1890 sculptures
Bronze sculptures in Illinois
Equestrian statues in Illinois
Monuments and memorials in Chicago
Outdoor sculptures in Chicago
Sculptures of men in Illinois
Sculptures of Native Americans in Illinois
Statues in Chicago
Works by Cyrus Edwin Dallin